Salah Shokweir (born 16 October 1929) is an Egyptian boxer. He competed in the men's lightweight event at the 1960 Summer Olympics.

References

1929 births
Living people
Egyptian male boxers
Olympic boxers of Egypt
Boxers at the 1960 Summer Olympics
People from El Mahalla El Kubra
Lightweight boxers
20th-century Egyptian people